Pandit Rajaram Shukl "Kisan" (1917 – 17 December 2013), also known as Rajaram Kisan, was an Indian Independence activist and politician who belongs to the Indian National Congress Party. He was elected MLA in 1952 and was member of the first state Uttar Pradesh Legislative Assembly (Vidhan Sabha), which had its term from 1952 to 1957.

On 17 December 2013 Rajaram died at Deum, Lalganj Ajhara.

References

1917 births
2013 deaths
People from Pratapgarh, Uttar Pradesh
Uttar Pradesh politicians
Indian National Congress politicians
Indian National Congress politicians from Uttar Pradesh